The women's 100 metre breaststroke competition of the swimming events at the 2011 World Aquatics Championships was held on July 25 with the preliminary round and the semifinals and July 26 with the final.

Records
Prior to the competition, the existing world and championship records were as follows.

Results

Heats

46 swimmers participated in 6 heats, qualified swimmers are listed:

Semifinals
The semifinals were held at 18:20.

Semifinal 1

Semifinal 2

Final
The final was held at 19:48.

References

External links
2011 World Aquatics Championships: Women's 100 metre breaststroke start list, from OmegaTiming.com; retrieved 2011-07-23.

Breaststroke 100 metre, women's
World Aquatics Championships
2011 in women's swimming